WR 121-16 is a transitional Wolf-Rayet star in the constellation of Scutum, near the Wild Duck Cluster (M11). It is located in the Far 3 kpc Arm of the Milky Way. It is very dim from Earth, having an apparent magnitude of about 14, from being so reddened by interstellar extinction, and its distance of over 23,000 light years. It is one of the dimmest known conventional Wolf-Rayet stars, with a luminosity of less than 76,000 times that of the Sun. WR 121-16 varies irregularly between magnitudes 13.95 and 14.14.

WR 121-16 is the most recent Wolf-Rayet star to be added to the Wolf-Rayet Star Catalogue, being the 667th star added. It was discovered in August 2020.

Discovery 
WR 121-16 was originally discovered as a ‘by-product’ of the LAMOST testing observations during the full moon nights, when the telescope was pointing to the open cluster M11, with WR 121-16 being about 42′ 24 apart from the centre of M11.

Features 
WR 121-16 is one of a few transitional Wolf-Rayet stars, which display both carbon and nitrogen emission, with a spectral type of WN7o/WC. Modelling the spectrum shows that WR 121-16 is not very luminous at all, with a luminosity of just , much less than most Wolf-Rayet stars. WR 121-16 has just over 7 solar masses, nearly all of which is helium. 1.5% of the star is composed of nitrogen.

Strong stellar winds, typical of Wolf-Rayet stars, with a terminal velocity of 1,000 kilometers per second are causing WR 121-16 to lose /year, much more than the Sun's (2-3) x 10−14 solar masses per year. The winds are so dense that the photosphere of the star is not visible.

References 

Wolf–Rayet stars
J18513970-0534510
Scutum (constellation)
Variable stars
TIC objects